Arctur-2 is a supercomputer located in Slovenia which is used by scientists and industry professionals to run intensive workloads and computer simulations such as aerodynamics simulations and steel casting simulations. 

The Arctur-2 High Performance Computer (HPC) is located in Nova Gorica (Slovenia) and was put into operation in early 2017. 
Arctur-2 is a system built by Sugon and consists of 30 nodes, each with two  Intel Xeon E5-2690v4 processors; 8 of these nodes are equipped with 4 Nvidia Tesla M60 GPUs each, and another 8 of them have big memory capacity of 1024GB per node. 

The supercomputer is managed by Arctur.

References 

GPGPU supercomputers
Supercomputing in Europe